Singers and Songwriters was a 19-volume album series issued by Time-Life in the US, during the early 2000s, spotlighting songs from the singer-songwriter era of the 1970s. There was an identically-named 29 volume series available in the UK and Europe, with different track listings and different, but similar artwork. Songs on the series included music written and performed by an artist, and artists who covered a well-known songwriter's material; as such, a large majority of the music was stylistically similar to what was heard on soft rock and (sometimes) contemporary hit radio stations during the 1970s and early 1980s.

Much like Time-Life's other series chronicling popular music, volumes in the "Singers and Songwriters" series covered a specific time period, including two-year spans in some volumes and parts of a given decade in others. Each volume was issued on a compact disc or cassette. Individual volumes generally contained two albums of 12 tracks each (24 songs per volume), and represented the highlighted time period's most popular and noteworthy tracks. The UK/European series had 15 tracks per disc making 30 tracks per volume. Also included was a booklet, containing liner notes written by some of the most respected historians of the genre, photographs of the artists, and information on the songs (writers, performers and peak position on Billboard magazines Hot 100 chart).

History
"Singers and Songwriters" was first issued in the US in the winter of 2000, with the first volume in the series titled Singers and Songwriters: 1972–1973. As was the case with Time-Life's other series, "Singers and Songwriters" was advertised in television and magazine advertisements. The series was available by subscription (by calling a 1-800 number); those who purchased the series in that fashion received a new volume roughly every other month (on the format of their choice), and had the option of keeping the volumes they wanted.

Each volume was also offered for individual sale. When the series was fully issued, a customer could purchase the entire series at once (or a group of albums, as packaged by Time-Life as part of a promotion), often at a discounted price.

New volumes continued to be issued through 2002, the final one being a volume titled Singers and Songwriters: Hard to Find Hits; an additional single-disc volume not included in the subscription series (but available for sale) was titled Singers and Songwriters: The Classics. Time-Life continued to offer "Singers and Songwriters" through the latter half of the 2000s.

All told, the US series had 432 tracks (429 songs with three titles repeated on various volumes). The UK/European series was much more expansive, finally comprising 870 tracks.

However, due to licensing restrictions, some of the songs in the original series were replaced with other songs instead, Artists like Gilbert O'Sullivan, Bob Seger, Neil Young,  and some of the familiar songs from James Taylor, including "You've Got A Friend", "Shower the People", and the more familiar songs from Joni Mitchell, including "You Turn Me On, I'm a Radio", and "Help Me", and Paul Simon, including "50 Ways to Leave your Lover", and "Mother and Child Reunion", and "Loves Me like a Rock" could not be included, due to the demands and high expenses imposed though the publishing companies The Gilbert O'Sullivan song "Alone Again Naturally" was omitted in the later collection due to the licensing restrictions issues. The song "Fool, If you think it's Over" by Chris Rea, is a different version of the song. In the original version Rea's voice was sped up. Rea was never happy with that recording and although a hit in the US wanted the original version buried. The re-recording is Rea singing in his normal voice. The Stevie Nicks song, plus the songs that Nicks did with Fleetwood Mac, could not be used in this collection, due to the same licensing restrictions.

The US series
As with many of Time-Life Records' multi-volume releases, the volumes were not issued in a logical, sequential order by date or era of the subject; that is, issuing volumes covering the 1960s before progressing into the 1970s. In the track information section, the volumes will be listed sequentially by era; the following list is the order in which the volumes were released. Also, unlike their other compilation series, Singers and Songwriters includes the album versions of songs rather than the single or radio edits.

2000
 Singers and Songwriters: 1972–1973
 Singers and Songwriters: 1970–1971
 Singers and Songwriters: 1974–1975
 Singers and Songwriters: 1976–1977
 Singers and Songwriters: 1978–1979
 Singers and Songwriters: The '60s

2001
 Singers and Songwriters: 1980–1982
 Singers and Songwriters: The Mid '70s
 Singers and Songwriters: The Early '70s
 Singers and Songwriters: The Late '70s
 Singers and Songwriters: 1970–1974
 Singers and Songwriters: 1975–1979
 Singers and Songwriters: 1979–1989
 Singers and Songwriters: 1964–1969
 Singers and Songwriters: The '70s
 Singers and Songwriters: 1969–1972
 Singers and Songwriters: The Classics

2002
 Singers and Songwriters: 1973–1975
 Singers and Songwriters: Hard to Find Hits

2004
 Singers and Songwriters: Lady Writers

2010
 Singers & Songwriters: TroubadoursThe UK/European SeriesAll of the European series had the prefix TL SSW/nn where nn is the catalogue number. There were 28 titles in the series plus a Christmas album with a different catalogue number. They were all double CDs with 15 tracks on each disc, making a total of 870 tracks, double the total number of the US series.2001TL SSW/01 – Singers and Songwriters 1973–1976

TL SSW/02 – Singers and Songwriters 1970–1972

TL SSW/03 – Singers and Songwriters 1977–1979

TL SSW/04 – Singers and Songwriters 1965–1969

TL SSW/05 – Singers and Songwriters 1980–1983

TL SSW/06 – Singers and Songwriters The Classics

TL SSW/07 – Singers and Songwriters Late 60s

TL SSW/08 – Singers and Songwriters Early 70s

TL SSW/09 – Singers and Songwriters Late 70s2002TL SSW/10 – Singers and Songwriters Early 80s

TL SSW/11 – Singers and Songwriters 1970–1974

TL SSW/12 – Singers and Songwriters 1975–1979

TL SSW/13 – Singers and Songwriters 1964–1969

TL SSW/14 – Singers and Songwriters 1980–1986

TL SSW/15 – Singers and Songwriters The Originals2003TL SSW/16 – Singers and Songwriters The Folk Years

TL SSW/17 – Singers and Songwriters Diary

TL SSW/18 – Singers and Songwriters Storytellers

TL SSW/19 – Singers and Songwriters All Through The 89s

TL SSW/20 – Singers and Songwriters Mavericks

TL SSW/21 – Singers and Songwriters Made In Australia (released 2002)

TL SSW/22 – Singers and Songwriters 1960–1964

TL SSW/23 – Singers and Songwriters Protest Songs

TL SSW/24 – Singers and Songwriters Pure and Simple2004TL SSW/25 – Singers and Songwriters Allstars

TL SSW/26 – Singers and Songwriters Lady Writers

TL SSW/27 – Singers and Songwriters Once Upon A Time In The West

TL SSW/28 – Singers and Songwriters Country USA

TL XXD/08 – Singers and Songwriters Christmas

Track listings (US versions)

Singers and Songwriters: The '60sDisc 1 "(Sittin' on) the Dock of the Bay" – Otis Redding
 "Turn! Turn! Turn! (To Everything There Is a Season)" – The Byrds
 "Monday Monday" – Mamas and The Papas
 "Daydream" – The Lovin' Spoonful
 "San Francisco (Be Sure to Wear Flowers in Your Hair)" – Scott McKenzie
 "Get Together" – The Youngbloods
 "You Were on My Mind" – We Five
 "A Beautiful Morning" – The Rascals
 "Abraham, Martin and John" – Dion
 "Both Sides Now" – Judy Collins
 "Gentle on My Mind" – Glen Campbell
 "The Weight" – The BandDisc 2 "Mr. Tambourine Man" – The Byrds
 "California Dreamin'" – Mamas and The Papas
 "Elusive Butterfly" – Bob Lind
 "Brown Eyed Girl" – Van Morrison
 "Society's Child (Baby I've Been Thinking)" – Janis Ian
 "Something in the Air" – Thunderclap Newman
 "Everybody's Talkin'" – Harry Nilsson
 "Different Drum" – The Stone Poneys featuring Linda Rondstadt
 "Solitary Man" – Neil Diamond
 "Catch the Wind" – Donovan
 "Early Morning Rain" – Gordon Lightfoot
 "To Ramona" – Bob Dylan

Singers and Songwriters: 1964–1969Disc 1 "Laugh, Laugh" – Beau Brummels
 "Ballad of Easy Rider" – The Byrds
 "Someday Soon" – Judy Collins
 "Creeque Alley" – Mamas and The Papas
 "Ode to Billie Joe" – Bobbie Gentry
 "By the Time I Get to Phoenix" – Glen Campbell
 "Red Rubber Ball" – The Cyrkle
 "One" – Three Dog Night
 "Up On Cripple Creek" – The Band
 "Stoned Soul Picnic" – The 5th Dimension
 "Games People Play" – Joe South
 "Wouldn't It Be Nice – The Beach BoysDisc 2 "Georgy Girl" – The Seekers
 "Ruby (Don't Take Your Love to Town)" – Kenny Rogers and the First Edition
 "Light My Fire" – Jose Feliciano
 "A Summer Song" – Chad And Jeremy
 "Did You Ever Have to Make Up Your Mind?" – The Lovin' Spoonful
 "59th Street Bridge Song (Feelin' Groovy)" – Harpers Bizarre
 "Baby the Rain Must Fall" – Glenn Yarbrough
 "Son of a Preacher Man" – Dusty Springfield
 "All I Really Want To Do" – Cher
 "Lalena" – Donovan
 "If I Were A Carpenter" – Bobby Darin
 "Wichita Lineman" – Glen Campbell

Singers and Songwriters: 1969–1972Disc 1 "Galveston" – Glen Campbell
 "Hooked On A Feeling" – B. J. Thomas
 "Beautiful Sunday" – Daniel Boone
 "Montego Bay" – Bobby Bloom
 "Too Busy Thinking About My Baby" – Marvin Gaye
 "Just My Imagination (Running Away With Me)" – The Temptations
 "Take A Letter Maria" – R. B. Greaves
 "Patches" – Clarence Carter
 "Put a Little Love in Your Heart" – Jackie DeShannon
 "Baby, Don't Get Hooked on Me" – Mac Davis
 "Knock Three Times" – Dawn featuring Tony Orlando
 "Never My Love" – The 5th DimensionDisc 2 "Build Me Up Buttercup" – The Foundations
 "The Lion Sleeps Tonight" – Robert John
 "Put Your Hand in the Hand" – Ocean
 "Rings" – Cymarron
 "One Tin Soldier (The Legend Of Billy Jack)" – Coven
 "Precious and Few" – Climax
 "Jean" – Olliver
 "Watching Scotty Grow" – Bobby Goldsboro
 "How Do You Do?" – Mouth & MacNeal
 "House at Pooh Corner" – Loggins & Messina
 "Truckin'" – The Grateful Dead
 "Sunday Morning Coming Down" – Johnny Cash

Singers and Songwriters: The '70sDisc 1 "Tiny Dancer" – Elton John
 "Only Love is Real" – Carole King
 "Reason to Believe" – Rod Stewart
 "Sail On" – The Commodores
 "Save It for a Rainy Day" – Stephen Bishop
 "Sitting" – Cat Stevens
 "Stir It Up" – Johnny Nash
 "The Tin Man" – America
 "Muskrat Love" – The Captain & Tennille
 "Fool (If You Think It's Over)" – Chris Rea
 "Lady Blue" – Leon RussellDisc 2 "Never Been to Spain" – Three Dog Night
 "Sharing the Night Together" – Dr. Hook
 "Dreidel" – Don McLean
 "Hummingbird" – Seals & Crofts
 "I Love" – Tom T. Hall
 "Love Is a Rose" – Linda Ronstadt
 "Country Boy (You Got Your Feet in L.A.)" – Glen Campbell
 "It Don't Matter To Me" – Bread
 "It's Sad to Belong" – England Dan & John Ford Coley
 "Never Gonna Fall in Love Again" – Eric Carmen
 "(Hey, Won't You Play) Another Somebody Done Somebody Wrong Song" – B. J. Thomas
 "Ain't No Way to Treat a Lady" – Helen Reddy
 "A Little More Love" – Olivia Newton-John

Singers and Songwriters: 1970–1974Disc 1 "It Never Rains in Southern California" – Albert Hammond
 "Me and You and a Dog Named Boo" – Lobo
 "We Gotta Get You a Woman" – Todd Rundgren
 "Use Me" – Bill Withers
 "It's All Over Now" – Ry Cooder
 "Make It With You" – Bread
 "I'd Like to Teach the World to Sing (in Perfect Harmony)" – The New Seekers
 "We May Never Pass This Way (Again)" – Seals & Crofts
 "I Just Can't Help Believing" – B. J. Thomas
 "One Toke Over The Line" – Brewer & Shipley
 "Love Song" – Anne Murray
 "Amazing Grace" – Judy CollinsDisc 2 "You Wear It Well" – Rod Stewart
 "Dixie Chicken" – Little Feat
 "Friend of the Devil" – The Grateful Dead
 "Never Ending Song of Love" – Delaney and Bonnie & Friends
 "Danny's Song" – Loggins & Messina
 "You Don't Mess Around With Jim" – Jim Croce
 "An Old Fashioned Love Song" – Three Dog Night
 "I Honestly Love You" – Olivia Newton-John
 "I Need You" – America
 "Castles in the Air" – Don McLean
 "Moonshadow" – Cat Stevens
 "WOLD" – Harry Chapin

Singers and Songwriters: 1970–1971Disc 1 "Maggie May" – Rod Stewart
 "It's Too Late" – Carole King
 "Me And Bobby McGee" – Janis Joplin
 "What's Going On" – Marvin Gaye
 "Wild World" – Cat Stevens
 "Ain't No Sunshine" – Bill Withers
 "Mr. Bojangles" – Nitty Gritty Dirt Band
 "Woodstock" – Matthews' Southern Comfort
 "Uncle John's Band" – The Grateful Dead
 "Here Comes The Sun" – Richie Havens
 "Love The One You're With" – Stephen Stills
 "Sunshine" – Jonathan EdwardsDisc 2 "Take Me Home, Country Roads" – John Denver with Fat City
 "Fire And Rain" – James Taylor
 "Gypsy Woman" – Brian Hyland
 "Peace Train" – Cat Stevens
 "He Ain't Heavy, He's My Brother" – The Hollies
 "That's the Way I've Always Heard It Should Be" – Carly Simon
 "Mercy Mercy Me (The Ecology)" – Marvin Gaye
 "The Night They Drove Old Dixie Down" – Joan Baez
 "If" – Bread
 "Lay Down (Candles In The Rain)" – Melanie With The Edwin Hawkins Singers
 "Jealous Guy" – John Lennon And The Plastic Ono Band
 "Only You Know and I Know" – Dave Mason

Singers and Songwriters: 1972–1973Disc 1 "The First Time Ever I Saw Your Face" – Roberta Flack
 "I Can See Clearly Now" – Johnny Nash
 "American Pie" – Don McLean
 "I Got A Name" – Jim Croce
 "Lean On Me" – Bill Withers
 "You're So Vain" – Carly Simon
 "A Horse With No Name" – America
 "Nights In White Satin" – The Moody Blues
 "Hello It's Me" – Todd Rundgren
 "Summer Breeze" – Seals & Crofts
 "Rocky Mountain High" – John Denver
 "City of New Orleans" – Arlo GuthrieDisc 2 "My Love" – Paul McCartney & Wings
 "Time in a Bottle" – Jim Croce
 "Kodachrome" – Paul Simon
 "Daniel" – Elton John
 "Danny's Song" – Anne Murray
 "Without You" – Nilsson
 "Just You 'n' Me" – Chicago
 "Morning Has Broken" – Cat Stevens
 "All I Know" – Art Garfunkel
 "Sweet Seasons" – Carole King
 "Guitar Man" – Bread
 "Don't Let Me Be Lonely Tonight" – James Taylor

Singers and Songwriters: 1973–1975Disc 1 "Brother Louie" – Stories
 "Jackie Blue" – Ozark Mountain Daredevils
 "Rock Me Gently" – Andy Kim
 "Corazón" – Carole King
 "Workin' at the Car Wash Blues" – Jim Croce
 "Leave Me Alone (Ruby Red Dress)" – Helen Reddy
 "Desperado" – Linda Ronstadt
 "The Morning After" – Maureen McGovern
 "Daisy Jane" – America
 "Midnight Train To Georgia" – Gladys Knight & The Pips
 "The Most Beautiful Girl" – Charlie Rich
 "Send in the Clowns" – Judy CollinsDisc 2 "Love Will Keep Us Together" – The Captain & Tennille
 "Rhinestone Cowboy" – Glen Campbell
 "Tie A Yellow Ribbon 'Round the Old Oak Tree" – Dawn featuring Tony Orlando
 "Shambala" – Three Dog Night
 "Hooked on a Feeling" – Blue Swede
 "The Night Chicago Died" – Paper Lace
 "Billy, Don't Be A Hero" – Bo Donaldson & The Heywoods
 "I'm Not in Love" – 10cc
 "Photographs and Memories" – Jim Croce
 "From Me To You" – Janis Ian
 "Thinking Of You" – Loggins & Messina
 "Mr. Tanner" – Harry Chapin

Singers and Songwriters: 1974–1975Disc 1 "Annie's Song" – John Denver
 "Black Water" – The Doobie Brothers
 "Cat's In The Cradle" – Harry Chapin
 "Haven't Got Time For The Pain" – Carly Simon
 "I Shot The Sheriff" – Eric Clapton
 "Don't Let The Sun Go Down On Me" – Elton John
 "Sister Golden Hair" – America
 "Mexico" – James Taylor
 "You're No Good" – Linda Ronstadt
 "I Can Help" – Billy Swan
 "Please Come to Boston" – Dave Loggins
 "Miracles" – Jefferson StarshipDisc 2 "Wildfire" – Michael Murphey
 "At Seventeen" – Janis Ian
 "You Are So Beautiful" – Joe Cocker
 "The Air That I Breathe" – The Hollies
 "You Won't See Me" – Anne Murray
 "I'll Have to Say I Love You in a Song" – Jim Croce
 "Sunshine on My Shoulders" – John Denver
 "Jazzman" – Carole King
 "How Long" – Ace
 "Poetry Man" – Phoebe Snow
 "Midnight Blue" – Melissa Manchester
 "Third Rate Romance" – Amazing Rhythm Aces

Singers and Songwriters: 1975–1979Disc 1 "You Make Loving Fun" – Fleetwood Mac
 "Minute By Minute" – The Doobie Brothers
 "Right Down The Line" – Gerry Rafferty
 "Have You Never Been Mellow" – Olivia Newton-John
 "Nights Are Forever Without You" – England Dan & John Ford Coley
 "Easy" – The Commodores
 "Love Will Find a Way" – Pablo Cruise
 "Strange Way" – Firefall
 "I Only Have Eyes For You" – Art Garfunkel
 "Chevy Van" – Sammy Johns
 "Thunder Island" – Jay Ferguson
 "I Like Dreamin'" – Kenny NolanDisc 2 "Amie" – Pure Prairie League
 "How Much I Feel" – Ambrosia
 "Nightingale" – Carole King
 "She's Gone" – Daryl Hall And John Oates
 "Lady" – Little River Band
 "Today's the Day" – America
 "Imaginary Lover" – Atlanta Rhythm Section
 "Count On Me" – Jefferson Starship
 "Shake It" – Iain Matthews
 "This Night Won't Last Forever" – Michael Johnson
 "Someone Saved My Life Tonight" – Elton John
 "Broken Hearted Me" – Anne Murray

Singers and Songwriters: 1976–1977Disc 1 "Still the One" – Orleans
 "Hello Old Friend" – Eric Clapton
 "Southern Nights" – Glen Campbell
 "If You Leave Me Now" – Chicago
 "Sara Smile" – Hall & Oates
 "Blue Bayou" – Linda Ronstadt
 "You Are the Woman" – Firefall
 "Welcome Back" – John Sebastian
 "I'd Really Love to See You Tonight" – England Dan & John Ford Coley
 "Don't Go Breaking My Heart" – Elton John And Kiki Dee
 "Get Closer" – Seals and Crofts
 "Dream Weaver" – Gary WrightDisc 2 "Say You Love Me" – Fleetwood Mac
 "Year Of The Cat" – Al Stewart
 "On and On" – Stephen Bishop
 "(Your Love Keeps Lifting Me) Higher and Higher" – Rita Coolidge
 "Lonely Boy" – Andrew Gold
 "We Just Disagree" – Dave Mason
 "Fooled Around and Fell in Love" – Elvin Bishop
 "Tracks of My Tears" – Linda Ronstadt
 "Right Time of the Night" – Jennifer Warnes
 "I'm in You" – Peter Frampton
 "All By Myself" – Eric Carmen
 "Lost Without Your Love" – Bread

Singers and Songwriters: 1978–1979Disc 1 "Baby Come Back" – Player
 "Sad Eyes" – Robert John
 "What A Fool Believes" – The Doobie Brothers
 "Baker Street" – Gerry Rafferty
 "Longer" – Dan Fogelberg
 "It's A Heartache" – Bonnie Tyler
 "Sometimes When We Touch" – Dan Hill
 "Reminiscing" – Little River Band
 "You're Only Lonely" – J.D. Souther
 "Time Passages" – Al Stewart
 "We'll Never Have to Say Goodbye Again" – England Dan & John Ford Coley
 "Werewolves Of London" – Warren ZevonDisc 2 "Just When I Needed You Most" – Randy Vanwarmer
 "Sultans of Swing" – Dire Straits
 "Whenever I Call You Friend" – Kenny Loggins with Stevie Nicks
 "Ooo Baby Baby" – Linda Ronstadt
 "Sentimental Lady" – Bob Welch
 "Crazy Love" – Poco
 "Slip Slidin' Away" – Paul Simon
 "Gold" – John Stewart
 "You Belong to Me" – Carly Simon
 "I Go Crazy" – Paul Davis
 "Lotta Love" – Nicolette Larson
 "Think About Me" – Fleetwood Mac

Singers and Songwriters: The Early '70sDisc 1 "Listen to the Music" – The Doobie Brothers
 "Operator (That's Not the Way It Feels)" – Jim Croce
 "Good Time Charlie's Got the Blues" – Danny O'Keefe
 "Raindrops Keep Fallin' On My Head" – B. J. Thomas
 "Baby I'm-a Want You" – Bread
 "Last Song" – Edward Bear
 "Alone Again (Naturally)" – Gilbert O'Sullivan
 "Garden Party" – Rick Nelson & the Stone Canyon Band
 "Drift Away" – Dobie Gray
 "I Saw The Light" – Todd Rundgren
 "Taxi" – Harry Chapin
 "Bridge Over Troubled Water" – Aretha FranklinDisc 2 "Brandy (You're a Fine Girl)" – Looking Glass
 "Mama Told Me (Not To Come)" – Three Dog Night
 "Help Me Make It Through the Night" – Sammi Smith
 "Delta Dawn" – Helen Reddy
 "The Night The Lights Went Out In Georgia" – Vicki Lawrence
 "I'd Love You to Want Me" – Lobo
 "Snowbird" – Anne Murray
 "Ventura Highway" – America
 "Don't Pull Your Love" – Hamilton, Joe Frank & Reynolds
 "Vincent" – Don McLean
 "Rainy Night in Georgia" – Brook Benton
 "Coconut" – Nilsson

Singers and Songwriters: The Mid '70sDisc 1 "Diamond Girl" – Seals & Crofts
 "Over My Head" – Fleetwood Mac
 "Goodbye Yellow Brick Road" – Elton John
 "Lonely People" – America
 "Wildflower" – Skylark
 "I'm Not Lisa" – Jessi Colter
 "When Will I Be Loved" – Linda Ronstadt
 "Don't Expect Me to Be Your Friend" – Lobo
 "My Eyes Adored You" – Frankie Valli
 "Seasons in the Sun" – Terry Jacks
 "Carolina in the Pines" – Michael Murphey
 "Love Is Alive" – Gary WrightDisc 2 "Midnight at the Oasis" – Maria Muldaur
 "Sugar Magnolia" – The Grateful Dead
 "Laughter in the Rain" – Neil Sedaka
 "(Hey, Won't You Play) Another Somebody Done Somebody Wrong Song" – B. J. Thomas
 "Coyote" – Joni Mitchell
 "Holdin' on to Yesterday" – Ambrosia
 "Bad, Bad Leroy Brown" – Jim Croce
 "My Maria" – B. W. Stevenson
 "Angie Baby" – Helen Reddy
 "Stuck in the Middle With You" – Stealers Wheels
 "Dancing in the Moonlight" – King Harvest
 "Sweet Love" – The Commodores

Singers and Songwriters: The Late '70sDisc 1 "Lonesome Loser" – Little River Band
 "So in to You" – Atlanta Rhythm Section
 "Baby, I Love Your Way" – Peter Frampton
 "Rich Girl" – Hall & Oates
 "Sorry Seems to Be the Hardest Word" – Elton John
 "We're All Alone" – Rita Coolidge
 "The Things We Do for Love" – 10cc
 "Escape (The Pina Colada Song)" – Rupert Holmes
 "Fly Away" – John Denver
 "When I Need You" – Leo Sayer
 "Bluer Than Blue" – Michael Johnson
 "Torn Between Two Lovers" – Mary MacGregorDisc 2 "Don't It Make My Brown Eyes Blue" – Crystal Gayle
 "Just Remember I Love You" – Firefall
 "Afternoon Delight" – Starland Vocal Band
 "It's So Easy" – Linda Ronstadt
 "Never Gonna Fall in Love Again" – Eric Carmen
 "Breaking Up Is Hard To Do" – Neil Sedaka
 "I'm Easy" – Keith Carradine
 "Magnet and Steel" – Walter Egan
 "You Needed Me" – Anne Murray
 "Three Times a Lady" – The Commodores
 "Love Is the Answer" – England Dan & John Ford Coley
 "Short People" – Randy Newman

Singers and Songwriters: 1979–1989Disc 1 "I've Got a Rock 'n' Roll Heart" – Eric Clapton
 "Walk of Life" – Dire Straits
 "Little Lies" – Fleetwood Mac
 "Sailing" – Christopher Cross
 "Angel of the Morning" – Juice Newton
 "Luka" – Suzanne Vega
 "Steal Away" – Robbie Dupree
 "Personally" – Karla Bonoff
 "I'm Alright" – Kenny Loggins
 "At This Moment" – Billy Vera & The Beaters
 "(There's) No Gettin' Over Me" – Ronnie Milsap
 "Him" – Rupert HolmesDisc 2 "You Belong to the City" – Glenn Frey
 "In The Air Tonight" – Phil Collins
 "I Want To Know What Love Is" – Foreigner
 "Got a Hold on Me" – Christine McVie
 "Chuck E.'s in Love" – Rickie Lee Jones
 "One Fine Day" – Carole King
 "The Night Owls" – Little River Band
 "Key Largo" – Bertie Higgins
 "More Than I Can Say" – Leo Sayer
 "It Might Be You" – Stephen Bishop
 "Let Me Love You Tonight" – Pure Prairie League
 "Always on My Mind" – Willie Nelson

Singers and Songwriters: 1980–1982Disc 1 "Bette Davis Eyes" – Kim Carnes
 "This Is It" – Kenny Loggins
 "Cool Change" – Little River Band
 "Real Love" – The Doobie Brothers
 "An American Dream" – The Dirt Band
 "Somebody's Knockin'" – Terri Gibbs
 "Seven Year Ache" – Rosanne Cash
 "Hard to Say" – Dan Fogelberg
 "Late in the Evening" – Paul Simon
 "Jojo" – Boz Scaggs
 "You Can Do Magic" – America
 "Wondering Where the Lions Are" – Bruce CockburnDisc 2 "I Keep Forgettin' (Every Time You're Near)" – Michael McDonald
 "Biggest Part of Me" – Ambrosia
 "Hold Me" – Fleetwood Mac
 "'65 Love Affair" – Paul Davis
 "Crying" – Don McLean
 "Waiting for a Girl Like You" – Foreigner
 "Ride Like the Wind" – Christopher Cross
 "Hearts" – Marty Balin
 "Hurt So Bad" – Linda Ronstadt
 "While You See a Chance" – Steve Winwood
 "Jesse" – Carly Simon
 "Romeo's Tune" – Steve Forbert

Singers and Songwriters: Hard to Find HitsDisc 1 "All I Want to Be is By Your Side" – Peter Frampton
 "Make Me Smile" – Chicago
 "Will You Still Love Me Tomorrow" – Carole King
 "'Til Tomorrow" – Don McLean
 "Who Knows Where the Time Goes" – Judy Collins
 "Jesus on the Mainline" – Ry Cooder
 "Be Free" – Loggins & Messina
 "New York's Not My Home" – Jim Croce
 "Rocky" – Austin Roberts
 "Help Is on Its Way" – Little River Band
 "Can't We Try" – Dan Hill with Vonda Shepard
 "Billy and Sue" – B. J. ThomasDisc 2'
 "Poor Poor Pitiful Me" – Linda Ronstadt
 "May You Never" – Eric Clapton
 "It's a Laugh" – Hall & Oates
 "Sweet Feelin'" – The Doobie Brothers
 "Gone Too Far" – England Dan & John Ford Coley
 "Sequel" – Harry Chapin
 "I Just Fall in Love Again" – Anne Murray
 "The Last to Know" – Dan Fogelberg
 "You're the Only Woman" – Ambrosia
 "She Believes in Me" – Kenny Rogers
 "Time is Here and Gone" – The Doobie Brothers
 "When the Party's Over" – Janis Ian

Singers and Songwriters: The Classics
(single disc only; 20 tracks)
 "For What It's Worth" – Buffalo Springfield
 "Sundown" – Gordon Lightfoot
 "Everybody's Talkin'" – Nilsson
 "Your Mama Don't Dance" – Loggins & Messina
 "Your Song" – Elton John
 "Still Crazy After All These Years" – Paul Simon
 "Lowdown" – Boz Scaggs
 "Still" – The Commodores
 "Brown-Eyed Girl" – Van Morrison
 "Anticipation" – Carly Simon
 "Tonight's The Night (Gonna Be Alright)" – Rod Stewart
 "So Far Away" – Carole King
 "Abraham, Martin and John" – Dion
 "Leaving On A Jet Plane" – Peter, Paul & Mary
 "Both Sides Now" – Judy Collins
 "(Sittin' on) the Dock of the Bay" – Otis Redding
 "If You Could Read My Mind" – Gordon Lightfoot
 "Everything I Own" – Bread
 "I'm Sorry" – John Denver
 "Leader of the Band" – Dan Fogelberg

External links
 Time-Life Music official site – for a listing of current products
 Time-Life Album Discography, Part 39: Singers and Songwriters
List of the UK/European Singers and Songwriters titles

Time–Life albums
Rock compilation albums